The Wilson Disease Association (WDA) is a nonprofit volunteer organization which has been established to support the people who suffer from Wilson's disease. The  Association's main mission is to finance scientific researches on this disease and enlightening people about it.

History 
The Association was created in 1978 in Binghamton, New York with the purpose to help the Pei family with 2 children suffering from Wilson disease by a group of individuals. The first president of the WDA was John Chung, the founder of the Association. He was a friend of the Pei family.

References 

1978 establishments in New York (state)
Organizations established in 1978
Medical and health organizations based in New York (state)
Health advocacy groups